Roger McHardy (born 13 August 1952) is  a former Australian rules footballer who played with Footscray in the Victorian Football League (VFL).

Notes

External links 		
		
		
		
				
		
Living people		
1952 births		
		
Australian rules footballers from Victoria (Australia)		
Western Bulldogs players
Doutta Stars Football Club players